(officially ) is an aquarium located in Iwaki, Fukushima, Japan. The aquarium opened on 15 July 2000. The public aquarium is the largest in the Tohoku region and is focusing on education of environment.

History
The nickname "Aquamarine Fukushima" was selected in 1998 from a total of 4,722 applications.

The 2011 Tōhoku earthquake and tsunami on 11 March 2011 resulted in power being cut off to the aquarium. Many fish died, but some marine mammals and sea birds were subsequently transferred to Kamogawa Sea World,  to the south, Ueno Zoo, Tokyo Sea Life Park, Kamogawa Sea World, Izu Mito Sea Paradise, and Enoshima Aquarium. Although the main building sustained only minor damage, outside pools were washed away, and there was major damage to the electrical system (causing the death of about 90% of the animals in the aquarium). The facility was closed after the tsunami, and reopened to the public on 15 July 2011, following restoration.

Exhibits

The aquarium highlights the sea life in the Shiome Sea, where rivers flow into the sea and meet the collision of the Kuroshio and Oyashio ocean currents. 

The centerpiece tank, "The Sea of tide", holds  and contains a triangular tunnel that separates two tanks with different water temperatures (the two currents).

In the main tank, Saury and Tuna are exhibited on the Kuroshio side, and the theme is the rules of the ocean in the natural world where strong ones survive.
The aquarium includes a botanical garden on the fourth floor that shows the plant life of Fukushima, and from which visitors can see the top of the main tank.　In 2009 and 2020, aquariums succeeded in raising Indo-Pacific sailfish for two months.

Aquariums are also focused on education about evolution. The coelacanth exhibition area holds multiple frozen specimens of West Indian Ocean coelacanth and Indonesian coelacanth.　Succeeded in underwater photography of the world's second coelacanth in the Indonesian waters. In Aquamarine Fukushima, a coelacanth robot that reproduces the movements of the coelacanth skeleton and muscles is installed.

Research and conservation will be reported in Bulletin "AMF NEWS". Aquariums also have a friendly tie-up with Tokyo Sea Life Park, Niigata City Aquarium, Monterey Bay Aquarium, Palau International Coral Reef Center, Ocean Park Hong Kong, Baltimore National Aquarium.

Facilities
The area is as follows.
Evolution of the sea and life
Fukushima river and coast
Seabirds and seabirds in the North Sea
Oceanic Galleria
Tropical Asian waterfront
Coral reef sea
Oyashio Ice Box
Sea of tide
Fukushima Sea-Road to the Continental Shelf-
Friendship tie-up garden information corner
Children's Experience Center Aquamarine Egg
Aquamarine Uonozoki-Children's Fisheries Museum-
BIOBIO Kappa no Sato
Serpent's Eye Beach
Goldfish Museum
Exciting Satoyama / Jomon no Sato
Kuwait-Fukushima Friendship Memorial Japanese Garden
Denma Ship Studio

See also
 Iwaki, Fukushima 
 Tokyo Sea Life Park

References

External links
 

Aquaria in Japan
Tourist attractions in Fukushima Prefecture
Buildings and structures in Fukushima Prefecture
Iwaki, Fukushima
Zoos established in 2000
2000 establishments in Japan